Sándor Mátrai (Born Sándor Magna, 20 November 1932 – 30 May 2002) was a Hungarian footballer.

During his club career he played for Ferencváros. He earned 81 caps for the Hungary national football team from 1956 to 1967, and participated in the 1958 FIFA World Cup, the 1962 FIFA World Cup, the 1964 European Nations' Cup, and the 1966 FIFA World Cup.

He was born in Nagyszénás and died in Budapest.

References
 
 Sándor Mátrai at Weltfussball.de  
 Hungary – Record International Players

1932 births
2002 deaths
Hungarian footballers
Hungary international footballers
1958 FIFA World Cup players
1962 FIFA World Cup players
1964 European Nations' Cup players
1966 FIFA World Cup players
Ferencvárosi TC footballers
Sportspeople from Békés County
Association football defenders